Savitsky (or Савіцький); other transliterations: Savicki, Savicky, Savitski, Savitskiy, Savitzky, Sawicki, Sawitzki, Sawizkii), feminine: Savitska or Savitskaya, is a Slavic surname. Notable bearers include:

Abraham Savitzky (1919–1999), American analytical chemist
Aleksandr Savitsky (born 1971), Kazakhstani swimmer
Bella Savitsky Abzug (1920–1998), American lawyer, congresswoman and social activist
Dmitri Savitski (1944-2019), Russian writer and poet
George Savitsky (born 1924), American football offensive tackle
Günter Sawitzki (born 1932), German footballer
Igor Savitsky (1915–1984), Soviet painter, archaeologist and collector
Konstantin Savitsky (1844–1905), Russian realist painter
Mikhail Savicki (born 1922), Belarusian painter
Silvestre Savitski, Russian-Colombian communist
Svetlana Savitskaya (born 1948), Soviet aviator and cosmonaut
Valentin Grigorievich Savitsky, Soviet submarine captain
Yevgeniy Savitskiy (1910–1990), Soviet aviator

See also
Savickas
Savickis
Sawicki
4303 Savitskij
Savitzky–Golay smoothing filter

Belarusian-language surnames
Russian-language surnames
Ukrainian-language surnames